WMS can refer to:

Technology and computing
Warehouse management system
Workflow management system
Web Map Service, a standard for Internet map servers
Windows Media Services, the streaming media server from Microsoft
Windows MultiPoint Server, a Microsoft Windows Server for Remote Desktops
WMS (hydrology software), watershed simulation software
Welfare Management System (NYC), New York, US
Workload management system, a component of gLite

Medicine
Wilderness Medical Society, US, for medical personnel working in the wilderness
Wechsler Memory Scale of memory function
Warwick Medical School, British medical school of Warwick University

Companies
WMS Industries and subsidiary WMS Gaming, US electronic gaming and amusement companies
Williams Medical Supplies, a medical supplies company, Rhymney, Wales

Schools
West Monmouth School in Pontypool, Wales
White Mountain School, in Bethlehem, New Hampshire, US